Radiovce is a village in Brvenica Municipality near the town of Tetovo in North Macedonia. The village of Radiovce is one of the newest in the municipality. The village is divided into several neighbourhoods including: Upper Radiovce; Middle Radiovce; Lower Radiovce; Zbiralo; Vakov; and Koriḱansko.

Geography and position

Radiovce is one of only a few villages in the Brvenica Municipality that is completely on flat land. The village lies near the Vardar and Bogovinjska rivers. These two rivers make for fertile soil and are good for agricultural and fishing purposes. Corn, beans, wheat, rye are some of the typical crops grown in Radiovce. The Suva Gora mountain, located near the village, is an important source of wood.

History
At the end of the 19th century, Radiovce was part of the Tetovo region of the Ottoman Empire. In 1900, roughly 140 people lived in the village, mostly Orthodox Slavs. After the fall of the Ottoman Empire, Radiovce fell under Serbian control. After the end of the World War I, Radiovce, along with the rest of the territory of that is now the Republic of Macedonia, became part of a new kingdom called the Kingdom of Serbs, Croats and Slovenes, and later on after 1945 SR Macedonia became an equal state of Socialist Federal Republic of Yugoslavia. After the fall of SFRY, Radiovce became part of the newly independent Republic of Macedonia.

Population and demographics
As of the 2021 census, Radiovce had 885 residents with the following ethnic composition:
Albanians 541
Macedonians 330
Persons for whom data are taken from administrative sources 14

According to the census in 2002, 1,049 people live in Radiovce. There is a mix of different ethnicities; 346 are Macedonians, 691 are Albanians and the rest are of other ethnicities. Of historical point of view, the population of Radiovce has always been with different ethnic groups. Also, it must be mentioned that the people have come from different parts of the Polog valley and from different parts of Macedonia. A big part of the population has come from the nearest villages Žerovjane, Lisec, Gradec, Strimnica and from the Porečie valley. The Albanian people primary have come from the villages Gurgurnica, Korita and Čegrane. Other nationalities in Radiovce are few Roma people and few Serbs. According to the 2002 census, the village had a total of 1049 inhabitants. Ethnic groups in the village include:

Albanians 691
Macedonians 346
Serbs 3 
Others 9

Gallery

References

External links

 Rumbletum.org actuell weather in Radiovce

Villages in Brvenica Municipality
Albanian communities in North Macedonia